Gillian Margaret Clark  (born 2 September 1961) is an English badminton commentator and former badminton player who specialized in doubles.

Badminton career

World Championships 
Clark won two bronze medals at the World Championships a decade apart; for women's doubles in 1983, and for mixed doubles in 1993.

Olympic Games 
Clark competed in badminton at the 1992 Summer Olympics in women's doubles with Julie Bradbury. In the first round they defeated Erma Sulistianingsih and Rosiana Tendean of Indonesia and in the second round Katrin Schmidt and Kerstin Ubben of Germany. In the quarterfinals they were beaten by the eventual gold medalists, Hwang Hye-young and Chung So-young of Korea, 5–15, 5–15.

All England Championship 
She reached the finals of the prestigious All England Open Championships; in the 1985 mixed doubles with Thomas Kihlström, the 1990 doubles with Gillian Gowers and 1994 the mixed with Chris Hunt.

Commonwealth Games 
Clark has won twelve Commonwealth Games medals spanning four Games from 1982 until 1994. The medal breakdown was six gold medals (one with Gillian Gowers in the doubles, one with Chris Hunt in the mixed doubles and four in the team event), three silver medals all in the doubles and three bronze medals in the singles and mixed doubles.

European Championships 
She won four gold medals at the biennial European Championships; three consecutively (1982, 1984, and 1986) in women's doubles and one in mixed doubles (1988).

Personal life 
Clark was harassed by a stalker for more than 10 years since 2001. The perpetrator was diagnosed with persistent delusional personality disorder and jailed for 2 years.

Achievements

World Championships 
Women's doubles

Mixed doubles

World Cup 
Women's doubles

Mixed doubles

Commonwealth Games 
Women's singles

Women's doubles

Mixed doubles

European Championships 
Women's doubles

Mixed doubles

European Junior Championships 
Girls' doubles

IBF World Grand Prix 
The World Badminton Grand Prix sanctioned by International Badminton Federation (IBF) since 1983.

Women's doubles

Mixed doubles

IBF International 
Women's singles

Women's doubles

Mixed doubles

References

External links 
 
 
 
 
 

1961 births
Living people
Sportspeople from Baghdad
English female badminton players
Badminton players at the 1992 Summer Olympics
Olympic badminton players of Great Britain
Badminton players at the 1982 Commonwealth Games
Badminton players at the 1986 Commonwealth Games
Badminton players at the 1990 Commonwealth Games
Badminton players at the 1994 Commonwealth Games
Commonwealth Games gold medallists for England
Commonwealth Games silver medallists for England
Commonwealth Games bronze medallists for England
Commonwealth Games medallists in badminton
Members of the Order of the British Empire
Medallists at the 1982 Commonwealth Games
Medallists at the 1986 Commonwealth Games
Medallists at the 1990 Commonwealth Games
Medallists at the 1994 Commonwealth Games